Jean Delahaye (4 November 1929 – 26 June 2017) was a French racing cyclist. He rode in the 1951 and 1952 Tour de France.

References

External links
 

1929 births
2017 deaths
French male cyclists
Sportspeople from Seine-Maritime